Hovhannes Barseghyan (born February 11, 1970, in Leninakan, Armenian SSR), also known as Hovhannes Barsegian or Oganes Barsegyan, is an Armenian retired weightlifter. He competed at the 1996 Summer Olympics in the men's 76 kg division. Barseghyan also won a bronze medal at the 1995 European Weightlifting Championships.

References

External links
 
 
 
 

1970 births
Living people
Sportspeople from Gyumri
Armenian male weightlifters
Olympic weightlifters of Armenia
Weightlifters at the 1996 Summer Olympics
European Weightlifting Championships medalists